İskender Alın (born 28 February 1984) is a Turkish professional football player who currently plays as a forward for Şile Yıldızspor.

Life and career
Alın began his football career when Yimpaş Yozgatspor signed him to a youth contract in 2001. He proceeded to bounce around at local clubs İstanbulspor and Fenerbahçe. He finished his youth career with 19 goals in 78 matches.

Alın made his professional breakthrough with Istanbul-based club Bakırköyspor in 2004. He was transferred to Kartalspor in 2006, and was transferred once more during the 2009 winter transfer window, this time to İstanbul Büyükşehir Belediyespor. He found his form in the 2009–10 season when he netted 10 goals, good enough for tenth place on the top scorers list.

On 14 July 2011 he was arrested because of match-fixing in Istanbul BB-Beşiktaş and was pardoned on 4 January 2012.

References

External links
 

1984 births
Living people
People from Beykoz
Footballers from Istanbul
Turkish footballers
Association football forwards
Süper Lig players
TFF First League players
TFF Second League players
Yimpaş Yozgatspor footballers
İstanbulspor footballers
Fenerbahçe S.K. footballers
Bakırköyspor footballers
Kartalspor footballers
İstanbul Başakşehir F.K. players
Boluspor footballers
Gaziantep F.K. footballers
Bucaspor footballers
Yeni Malatyaspor footballers
Kastamonuspor footballers
Sarıyer S.K. footballers